Granby is a town in far northern Hartford County, Connecticut, United States. The population was 10,903 at the 2020 census. The town center is defined as a census-designated place known as Salmon Brook. Other areas in town include North Granby and West Granby. Granby is a rural town, located in the foothills of the Litchfield Hills of the Berkshires, besides the suburban natured center, the outskirts of town are filled with dense woods and rolling hills and mountains. From the 1890s to the 1920s many immigrants from Sweden came to reside in the town.

History

Granby was founded by people who lived in Simsbury and settled as early as 1723. Granby was part of Simsbury until 1786, when it became independent. The name is from Granby, Massachusetts in return, where it was named in honor of John Manners, Marquess of Granby.

Part of Southwick, Massachusetts, known as "the Notch" seceded from Massachusetts in 1774, just before the outbreak of the American Revolutionary War. This territory became part of Granby when it seceded from Simsbury, but was returned to Southwick as part of an 1803–1804 border dispute compromise. (See History of Massachusetts.)

In 1707, Daniel Hayes (born  – died 1756), then aged twenty-two, was captured and kidnapped by a hostile indigenous tribe and carried off to Canada. The capture was witnessed, and a rescue party raised, but the group did not catch up with the captors. He was tied up each night, and bound to saplings. It took thirty days to reach Canada, at which point Hayes was forced to run the gauntlet. Near the end of the gauntlet, he hid in a wigwam to avoid an attempted blow by a club. The woman in the wigwam declared that the house was sacred, and having lost a husband and son to a war, adopted Hayes as her son. He remained for several years, attending to the woman. Eventually, he was sold to a Frenchman, who learned that Hayes had skill as a weaver, so put him to work in that business. Hayes managed to earn enough to buy his freedom after two years. He then returned to Simsbury, settled down on a farm and married. He became prominent, both in civil affairs as well as the church at Salmon Brook (now Granby).

The first unauthorized coins minted in the American colonies, and the first in Connecticut, were struck by Dr. Samuel Higley in 1737 from copper mined from his own mine. The coins, including the Trader's Currency Token of the Colony of Connecticut were minted in North Simsbury, now called Granby. These coins were made of pure copper, which is very soft. Consequently, there are very few in existence today. The first coins were inscribed with a value of three pence. Later versions carried the phrase "Value me as you please."

In 1858, the eastern part of the town broke off and formed to become East Granby, the town is one of the newly established town in the state.

In 2009 Connecticut Magazine ranked Granby the #3 overall Connecticut small town (population 10,000–15,000) to live in, and #1 small town in Hartford County.

The town seal depicts the Dewey-Granby Oak, a large white oak estimated to be 450–500 years old, thought to be one of the oldest trees in New England.

Geography
Granby is warm and often humid in summer, with occasional thunderstorms, while winter can have heavy snow and cold temperatures. Snow and cold temperatures are not uncommon in early spring and late fall due to the town's location in the Berkshires.

Demographics

As of the census of 2000, there were 10,347 people, 3,781 households, and 2,994 families residing in the town. The racial makeup of the town was 97.54% White, 0.61% African American, 0.23% Native American, 0.74% Asian, 0.02% Pacific Islander, 0.23% from other races, and 0.63% from two or more races. Hispanic or Latino of any race were 1.30% of the population.

There were 3,781 households, out of which 39.5% had children under the age of 18 living with them, 71.1% were married couples living together, 5.9% had a female householder with no husband present, and 20.8% were non-families. 16.5% of all households were made up of individuals, and 6.8% had someone living alone who was 65 years of age or older.  The average household size was 2.71 and the average family size was 3.06.

In the town, the population was spread out, with 27.3% under the age of 18, 3.7% from 18 to 24, 30.1% from 25 to 44, 27.8% from 45 to 64, and 11.0% who were 65 years of age or older.  The median age was 40 years. For every 100 females, there were 98.7 males.  For every 100 females age 18 and over, there were 95.1 males.

The median income for a household in the town was $81,151, and the median income for a family was $90,057. Males had a median income of $63,093 versus $42,203 for females. The per capita income for the town was $33,863.  About 1.5% of families and 3.1% of the population were below the poverty line, including 3.6% of those under age 18 and 3.2% of those age 65 or over.

Government and politics

Education

Granby's public school system consists of one primary school, one intermediate school, one middle school, and one high school.

Kelly Lane Primary School (Grades: K–2)
Wells Road Intermediate School (Grades: 3–5)
Granby Memorial Middle School (Grades: 6–8)
Granby Memorial High School (Grades: 9–12)

National Register of Historic Places

 Allen's Cider Mill
 Frederick H. Cossitt Library
 Granby Center Historic District
 Samuel Hayes II House
 Judah Holcomb House
 Nathaniel Holcomb III House
 Rowe and Weed Houses
 West Granby Historic District

Notable people

 Adam Burt (born 1969), former NHL player, played with the Hartford Whalers
 Joe Bouchard (born 1948), musician, member of Blue Öyster Cult
 Jesse Camp (born 1979), MTV VJ
 Chauncey Forward (1793–1839), congressman from Pennsylvania
 Bryan Nash Gill (1961–2013), artist
 George S. Godard (1865–1936), librarian
 Philip C. Hayes (1833–1916), congressman from Illinois
 Byron Kilbourn (1801–1870), surveyor and politician
 Rebecca Lobo (born 1973), former Women's National Basketball Association player
 Garrett Lucash (born 1978), figure skater
 Theodore Mills Maltbie (1842–1915), lawyer and politician
 William M. Maltbie (1880–1961), Chief Justice of the Connecticut Supreme Court
 Aaron Draper Shattuck (1832–1928), painter of the White Mountain School

Notes

References

External links

Town of Granby official website

 
Towns in Hartford County, Connecticut
Towns in Connecticut
Greater Hartford